The 1947 Hawaii Rainbows football team was an American football team that represented the University of Hawaii as an independent during the 1947 college football season.  In its third season under head coach Tom Kaulukukui, the team compiled an 8–5 record, including a 27–13 victory over Fresno State in the 17th annual Shrine Game, and a 33–32 victory over Redlands in the fourth annual Pineapple Bowl. The team played its home games at Honolulu Stadium in Honolulu.

In an October 4 loss to Utah, the team gained only 57 yards (all by rushing) and converted only two first downs, both of which remain the lowest single-game totals in program history.

Five of Hawaii's victories were over members of the Hawaii Senior Football League – the Moiliili Bears, Olympics, Kaialums, Leilehuas, and Mickalums. The Kaialums, Leilehuas, and Mickalums consisted of alumni of the area's Kaimuki, Leilehua, and President William McKinley High Schools.

Schedule

References

Hawaii
Hawaii Rainbow Warriors football seasons
Hawaii Rainbows football